Atlanta Township is a township in Rice County, Kansas, United States, established in 1871. According to the 2017 census, it has a population of 183.

References

Townships in Rice County, Kansas
Townships in Kansas